John McMullen (October 7, 1843 – April 5, 1922) was a member of the Wisconsin State Senate.

Biography
McMullen was born on October 7, 1843 in Kingston, Province of Canada. He moved to Chilton, Wisconsin in 1855 and attended the University of Wisconsin-Madison and the University of Michigan. He died in Chilton on April 5, 1922.

Career
McMullen was a member of the Senate from the 15th district from 1895 to 1898. Previously, he was District Attorney of Calumet County, Wisconsin from 1868 to 1878. He was a Democrat.

References

External links

People from Kingston, Ontario
Pre-Confederation Canadian emigrants to the United States
People from Chilton, Wisconsin
Democratic Party Wisconsin state senators
Wisconsin lawyers
University of Wisconsin–Madison alumni
University of Michigan alumni
1843 births
1922 deaths
19th-century American lawyers